Chambeh (also known as Chamba and Chemba) is a village in Gheyzaniyeh Rural District, in the Central District of Ahvaz County, Khuzestan Province, Iran. At the 2006 census, its population was 71, in 17 families.

References 

Populated places in Ahvaz County